Geumo Land is an amusement park near the base of Geumo Mountain, near the city of Gumi, Gyeongsangbuk-do, South Korea.

Rides include a Viking ship, tagada, bumper cars and viba train. It also offers ice skating, and, in the winter, sled riding.

References

External links
Official site 

Amusement parks in South Korea
Tourist attractions in North Gyeongsang Province
Buildings and structures in North Gyeongsang Province